Guatemalia is a genus of flies in the family Sciomyzidae, the marsh flies or snail-killing flies.

Species
G. nigritarsis Marinoni, 1992
G. straminata (Wulp, 1897)

References

Sciomyzidae
Sciomyzoidea genera